"From the Clouds" is a song by American singer Jack Johnson from his 2010 album, To the Sea. It was released on February 28, 2011, and was the final single from the album.

Composition 
Johnson wanted to have a track on his album by which he played both the acoustic, and electric guitar at the same time.

Release 
The song was released as a CD single on February 28, 2011.

Music video 
The official music video for the song was shot at an Olympic diving pool in Mission Viejo, California, and directed by Emmett Malloy. The video was shot by filming Johnson jump off a 40-foot diving board into the water while he sung to the song at 6,500 frames per second. The video was originally supposed to feature Johnson sky dive off of a plane with a camera man strapped to his back to film him. But Johnson felt that viewers wouldn't get the full affect if he filmed it this way. The music video was released on Johnson's vevo channel on March 1, 2011, and currently has over 1.5 million views on YouTube.

Live performances 
Johnson performed the song a total of 21 times during his 2010 To the SeaWorld Tour, and performed it six times during his 2011 World Tour.

References

External links

2011 singles
2011 songs
Jack Johnson (musician) songs
Songs written by Jack Johnson (musician)